Stefanos Dragoumis (1842September 17, 1923) was a judge, writer and the Prime Minister of Greece from January to October 1910.  He was the father of Ion Dragoumis.

Early years
Dragoumis was born in Athens. His grandfather, Markos Dragoumis (1770–1854), who was born in a prominent Greek family from Vogatsiko in the present Kastoria regional unit, had been a member of the 1814–1821 revolutionary Filiki Eteria, while his father Nikolaos Dragoumis was secretary of Ioannis Kapodistrias. Born in Athens in 1842, Dragoumis studied law at the University of Paris and became a judge.

Political career
He became Secretary-General of the Ministry of Justice and was very active politically. He was later elected a member of Parliament and served as Minister of Foreign Affairs, Minister of Justice and Minister of the Interior. He was also active in the Macedonian Struggle. The organization Macedonian Committee was formed in 1904 by Stephanos Dragoumis in Athens.

1909 reform government
Following the Goudi Revolt by the Military League in 1909, the political processes in Greece were in a state of turmoil.  The issue of Cretan annexation and military reforms loomed large. After Kiriakoulis Mavromichalis resigned as Prime Minister in January 1910, Dragoumis was appointed as part of a reform government and the Military League dissolved. At the same time, Eleftherios Venizelos arrived in Athens from Crete. In March, the Greek Parliament decided to convoke a Revisionary Parliament to revise the Greek Constitution. The Dragoumis government responded positively to the demands of its dual mission: to secure a smooth path towards the process of reform and to complete its legislative programme. By September, Venizelos had arrived in Athens and by drawing large crowds to rallies had established his political strength.  King George invited Venizelos to form a government and Dragoumis resigned.

Later career

During the Balkan Wars, he served as Governor-General of Crete, and later (June 1913) of Macedonia. During the National Schism, he sided with the anti-Venizelist, royalist faction. He was elected to Parliament in the December 1915 elections, which the Venizelists boycotted, and served as Finance Minister in the Alexandros Zaimis and Stephanos Skouloudis cabinets. Dragoumis was dismissed from his seat in 1917, when Venizelos re-instated the May 1915 Parliament ("Lazarus Parliament"), but was re-elected as an MP in the November 1920 elections. He died in Athens.

References

1842 births
1923 deaths
20th-century prime ministers of Greece
Eastern Orthodox Christians from Greece
Writers from Athens
Foreign ministers of Greece
Justice ministers of Greece
Prime Ministers of Greece
People of the Macedonian Struggle
Greek Macedonians
Politicians from Athens
Governors-General of Crete
Governors-General of Macedonia
Greek MPs 1915–1917
Greek MPs 1920–1922
Finance ministers of Greece
Ministers of the Interior of Greece
Dragoumis family
Greek MPs 1910 (August–November)
Greek MPs 1910–1912
Greek MPs 1879–1881
Greek MPs 1881–1885
Greek MPs 1885–1887
Greek MPs 1887–1890
Greek MPs 1890–1892
Greek MPs 1892–1895
Greek MPs 1899–1902
Greek MPs 1905–1906
Greek MPs 1906–1910